KF Behar Vitomirica is a professional football club from Kosovo which competes in the Second League. The club is based in Pejë. Their home ground is the KF Behari Stadium which has a seating capacity of 1,000.

See also
 List of football clubs in Kosovo

References

Football clubs in Kosovo
Association football clubs established in 1979
Sport in Peja